Club Baloncesto Collado Villalba was a professional basketball club based in Collado Villalba, Spain.

History
CB Collado Villalba was founded in 1922. During its first years in Liga ACB, the club had the sponsorship of the actual BBVA bank, in that years known as Bancobao and later as BBV. In the 1990–91 ACB season, Jesús Gil acquires the team and converts it in the basketball section of Atlético de Madrid, but it ceased the next season.

After the 1991–92 ACB season, where the team avoided the relegation to Primera B, CB Collado Villalba was dissolved due to its financial trouble.

Season by season

Notable players
 Juan Antonio Orenga
 David Brabender
 Walter Berry
 Mark Landsberger
 Rory White
 Lance Berwald
 Henry Turner
 Tod Murphy
 Winfred King

External links
Profile at ACB.com
Positions in ACB at Linguasport

Defunct basketball teams in Spain
Former Liga ACB teams
Atlético Madrid
Basketball teams in the Community of Madrid